Fēngjiàn was a political ideology and governance system in ancient China, whose social structure formed a decentralized system of confederation-like government based on the ruling class consisting of the Son of Heaven (king) and nobles, and the lower class consisting of commoners categorized into four occupations (or "four categories of the people", namely gentries, peasants, laborers and merchants). The system dated back at least to the Shang dynasty, but was formally coined during the Western Zhou dynasty when the Zhou kings enfeoffed their clan relatives and fellow warriors as vassals.  Through the fengjian system, the king would allocate an area of land to a noble, establishing him as the de facto ruler of that region and allowing his title and fief to be legitimately inherited by his descendants.  This created large numbers of local domains, which became autonomous states.

The rulers of these vassal states, known as zhūhóu, had a political obligation to pay homage to the king, but as the central authority started to decline during the Eastern Zhou dynasty, they eventually grew rebellious and developed into their own kingdoms, reducing the Zhou dynasty to merely an empty name.  As a result, Chinese history from the Zhou dynasty (1046 BC–256 BC) to the beginning of the Qin dynasty has been termed a feudal period by many Chinese historians, due to the custom of enfeoffment of land similar to that in Medieval Europe. However, scholars have suggested that fengjian otherwise lacks some of the fundamental aspects of feudalism.  This system is often conflated with Confucianism but also with Legalism.

Each fengjian state was autonomous and had its own tax and legal systems along with its own unique currency and even writing style.  The nobles were required to pay regular homage to the king and to provide him with soldiers in a time of war.  This structure played an important part in the political structure of the Western Zhou which was expanding its territories in the east.  In due course this resulted in the increasing power of the noble lords, whose strength eventually exceeded that of the Zhou kings, leading to dwindling central authority.  The vassal states started to completely ignore the Zhou court and fight with each other for land, wealth and influence, which eventually disintegrated the authority of the Eastern Zhou into the chaos and violence of the Warring States period, where the great lords ended up proclaiming themselves as kings.

During the pre-Qin period, fengjian represented the Zhou dynasty's political system, and various thinkers, such as Confucius, looked to this system as a concrete ideal of political organization.  In particular, according to Confucius, during the Spring and Autumn period the traditional system of rituals and music had become empty and hence his goal was to return to or bring back the early Zhou dynasty political system.  With the establishment of the Qin dynasty in 220 BCE, the First Emperor unified the country and abolished the fengjian system, consolidating a new system of administrative divisions called the junxian system (郡縣制, "commandery-county system") or prefectural system, with the establishment of thirty-six prefectures and a rotational system for appointing local officials.  There are many differences between the two systems, but one is particularly worth mentioning: the prefectural system gave more power to the central government, since it congealed power at the political center or the top of the empire's political hierarchy.  From the Qin dynasty onward, Chinese literati would find a tension between the Confucian ideal of fengjian and the reality of the centralized imperial system.

After the establishment of the Han dynasty, Confucianism became the reigning imperial ideology and scholars and court officials alike again began to look to the Zhou dynasty fengjian system as an ideal. These scholars advocated incorporating elements of the fengjian system into the junxian system. The Han dynasty emperors ultimately chose to parcel out land to their relatives, thus combining the junxian and fengjian systems.

Four occupations

The four occupations were the shì (士) the class of "knightly" scholars, mostly from lower aristocratic orders, the gōng (工) who were the artisans and craftsmen of the kingdom and who, like the farmers, produced essential goods needed by themselves and the rest of society, the nóng (农/農) who were the peasant farmers who cultivated the land which provided the essential food for the people and tributes to the king, and the shāng (商) who were the merchants and traders of the kingdom.

Zōngfǎ (宗法, Clan Law), which applied to all social classes, governed the primogeniture of rank and succession of other siblings. The eldest son of the consort would inherit the title and retained the same rank within the system. Other sons from the consort, concubines, and mistresses would be given titles one rank lower than their father. As time went by, all of these terms lost their original meanings, yet Zhūhóu (诸侯), Dafu (大夫), and Shi (士) became synonyms for court officials.

The four occupations under the fēngjiàn system differed from those of European feudalism in that people were not born into the specific classes, such that, for example, a son born to a gōng craftsman was able to become a part of the shāng merchant class, and so on.

The sizes of troops and domains a male noble could command would be determined by his rank of peerage, which from highest to lowest were:

 duke - gōng 公(爵)
 marquis or marquess - hóu 侯(爵)
 count or earl - bó 伯(爵)
 viscount - zǐ 子(爵)
 baron - nán 男(爵)

While before the Han dynasty a peer with a place name in his title actually governed that place, it was only nominally true afterwards. Any male member of the Han nobility or gentry could be called a gongzi (公子 gōng zǐ), while any son of a king could be called a wangzi (王子 wáng zǐ, i.e. prince).

Well-field system

The well-field system was a Chinese land distribution method existing between the ninth century BC (late Western Zhou Dynasty) to around the end of the Warring States period. Its name comes from Chinese character 井 (jǐng), which means 'well' and looks like the # symbol; this character represents the theoretical appearance of land division: a square area of land was divided into nine identically-sized sections; the eight outer sections (私田; sītián) were privately cultivated by serfs and the center section (公田; gōngtián) was communally cultivated on behalf of the landowning aristocrat.

While all fields were aristocrat-owned,, the private fields were managed exclusively by serfs and the produce was entirely the farmers'. It was only produce from the communal fields, worked on by all eight families, that went to the aristocrats, and which, in turn, could go to the king as tribute.

As part of a larger feudal fēngjiàn system, the well-field system became strained in the Spring and Autumn period as kinship ties between aristocrats became meaningless.  When the system became economically untenable in the Warring States period, it was replaced by a system of private land ownership.  It was first suspended in the state of Qin by Shang Yang and the other Chinese states soon followed suit.

As part of the "turning the clock back" reformations by Wang Mang during the short-lived Xin Dynasty, the system was restored temporarily  and renamed to the King's Fields (王田; wángtián). The practice was more-or-less ended by the Song Dynasty, but scholars like Zhang Zai and Su Xun were enthusiastic about its restoration and spoke of it in a perhaps oversimplifying admiration, invoking Mencius's frequent praise of the system.

"Feudalism" and Chinese Marxism
Marxist historians in China have described Chinese ancient society as largely feudal. The fengjian system is particularly important to Marxist historiographical interpretation of Chinese history in China, from a slave society to a feudal society. The first to propose the use of this term for Chinese society was the Marxist historian and one of the leading writers of 20th-century China, Guo Moruo in the 1930s. Guo Moruo's views dominated the official interpretation of historical records, according to which the political system during the Zhou dynasty can be seen as feudal in many respects and comparable to the feudalistic system in medieval Europe. Guo Moruo based his application of this term on two assumptions:

The first assumption was that feudalism was a form of social organization which arises under certain circumstances, mainly the deterioration of a centralized form of government which is replaced by independent feudal states owing only minimal duties and loyalty to a central ruler. This situation is supposed to have prevailed in China after the decline of the Shang dynasty and the conquering of Shang territories by the Zhou clan. One of the reasons for the shift to feudal states is claimed to be the introduction of iron metallurgy.

The second assumption for classifying the Zhou as feudal by Guo Moruo was the similarity of the essential elements of feudalism that included the granting of land in the form of 'fiefs' to the knighted gentry, as was the case of European feudalism. There land fiefs were granted by lords or the monarch to knights, who were considered the ‘vassals’, who in return promised loyalty to the lord and provided military support during periods of war. In China, instead of a salary, each noble was given land by the Zhou ruler along with the people living on it who worked on the land and gave part of the produce they raised to the nobles as a tax. These 'fiefs' were granted through elaborate ceremonies during the Western Zhou period, where the plots of land, title and rank were granted in formal symbolic ceremonies which were incredibly lavish and which are comparable to the homage ceremonies in Europe where the vassal took the oath of loyalty and fidelity when being granted land that was also called a ‘fief’. These ceremonies in the ancient Zhou dynasty were commemorated in inscriptions on bronze vessels, many of which date back to the early Zhou dynasty. Some bronze vessel inscriptions also confirm involvement of military activity in these feudal relationships.

Comparisons
Under the Zhou feudal society, the feudal relationship was based on kinship and the contractual nature was not as precise or clearly delineated, whereas in the European model, the lord and vassal had clearly specified mutual obligations and duties. Medieval European feudalism realized the classic case of the 'noble lord' while, in the middle and latter phases of the Chinese feudal society, the landlord system was instead to be found.  In Europe, the feudal lordships were hereditary and irrevocable and were passed on from generation to generation, whereas the Zhou lordships were not hereditary, required reappointment by the king, and could be revoked. The medieval serf was bound to the land and could not leave or dispose of it, whereas the Zhou peasant was free to leave or, if he had the means, to purchase the land in small parcels.

Moreover, in Europe, feudalism was also considered to be a hierarchical economic system in which the lords were at the top of the structure, followed by the vassals, and then the peasants who were legally bound to the land and were responsible for all production. In Zhou rule, the feudal system was solely political and was not responsible for governing the economy.

Furthermore, according to China-A New History by John K. Fairbank and Merle Goldman, dissimilarities existed between the merchant class of the two systems as well.  In feudal Europe, the merchant class saw a marked development in towns located away from the influence of the manors and their attached villages. The European towns could grow outside of the feudal system instead of being integrated into it since the landed aristocrats were settled in manors. Thus, the towns and their people were independent of the influence of the feudal lords and were usually solely under the political authority of the monarchs of the European kingdoms. In China, these conditions were non-existent and the king and his officials depended greatly on the landed gentry for all governance, within towns and without. Thus no independent political power existed to encourage the growth of the merchant class in an independent manner. Chinese towns and villages were part of a fully integrated political system and the merchants remained under the political control of the gentry class instead of setting up an independent trading or mercantile economy.

Regardless of the similarities of an overwhelmingly agrarian society being dominated by the feudal lords in both societies, the application of the term 'feudal' to the society of the Western Zhou has been a subject of considerable debate due to the differences between the two systems. The Zhou feudal system was termed as being 'protobureaucratic' (The Prehistory and Early History of China – by J.A.G. Roberts) and bureaucracy existed alongside feudalism, while in Europe, bureaucracy emerged as a counter system to the feudal order.

Therefore, according to some historians, the term feudalism is not an exact fit for the Western Zhou political structure but it can be considered a system somewhat analogous to the one that existed in medieval Europe. According to Terence J. Byres in Feudalism and Non European Societies, "feudalism in China no longer represents a deviation from the norm based on European feudalism, but is a classic case of feudalism in its own right."

See also 

 Ancient Chinese states
 Spring and Autumn period
 Warring States period
 Eighteen Kingdoms
 Chinese nobility
 Agriculture in China
 Economic history of China
 Ejido
 Equal-field system
 Sharecropper
 Tenancy
 Indian feudalism
 Feudal Japan
 Feudalism in Pakistan
 Ritsuryō

References

Bibliography

Works cited 
 The Prehistory and Early History of China – by J.A.G. Roberts
 China-A New history by John K. Fairbank and Merle Goldman
 Byres, Terence and Harbans Mukhia, (1985). Feudalism and non European societies. Stonebridge Press, Bristol. pp. 213, 218, 
 Levenson, Schurmann, Joseph, Franz (1969). China-An Interpretive History: From the Beginnings to the Fall of Han. London, England: Regents of the University of California. pp. 34–36. .
 Dirlik, Arif (1985). Feudalism and Non European Societies. London: Frank Cass and Co. limited. pp. 198, 199. 
 China Travel Discovery
 http://www.hceis.com/chinabasic/history/zhou%20dynasty%20history.htm
 http://www.hceis.com/chinabasic/history/zhou%20dynasty%20history.htm#Kings
 https://web.archive.org/web/20130531215622/http://www.chinaknowledge.de/History/Zhou/zhou-admin.html 1st para
 http://www.chinaknowledge.de/History/Zhou/zhou.html

External links
Encyclopædia Britannica
 http://totallyhistory.com/zhou-dynasty-1045-256-bc/
 https://web.archive.org/web/20130531215622/http://www.chinaknowledge.de/History/Zhou/zhou-admin.html

Zhou dynasty
Feudalism in China
History of agriculture in China
Agriculture in China
Economic history of China
Social history of China
Ancient Chinese institutions